Drillia knudseni is a species of predatory sea snail, a marine gastropod mollusc in the family Drilliidae.

Description

Distribution
The snail can be found in the South Atlantic Ocean off the coast of Africa, from south of the Gulf of Guinea to the ocean west of Angola.

References

 Tippett D.L. (2006a) Taxonomic notes on some Indo-Pacific and West African Drillia species (Conoidea: Drillidae). Iberus, 24, 13–21 page(s): p. 20

knudseni
Gastropods described in 2006